Roy McConnell may refer to:

 Roy McConnell (footballer) (1927–2003), Australian rules footballer
 Roy McConnell (RAF officer) (1898–?), Canadian World War I flying ace